Toroto may refer to:
 Tarator, sometimes known in Turkish as toroto, a type of soup
 Toroto, a character in the 2011 French film Le dossier Toroto

See also 
 Totoro (disambiguation)